HMAS Benalla (A 04) is a Paluma-class survey motor launch of the Royal Australian Navy (RAN).

Design and construction

The Paluma-class vessels have a full load displacement of 320 tonnes. Propulsion machinery consists of two General Motors Detroit Diesel 12V-92T engines, which supply  to the two propeller shafts.

The sensor suite of a Paluma-class launch consists of a JRC JMA-3710-6 navigational radar, an ELAC LAZ 72 side-scan mapping sonar, and a Skipper 113 hull-mounted scanning sonar. The vessels are unarmed. The standard ship's company consists of three officers and eleven sailors, although another four personnel can be accommodated. The catamarans were originally painted white, but were repainted naval grey in 2002.

Benalla was laid down by Eglo Engineering, on 25 November 1988, was launched on 31 January 1990, and commissioned into the RAN on 20 March 1990. The ship was named for the city of Benalla, Victoria.

Operational history
In October 2013, Benalla participated in the International Fleet Review 2013 in Sydney.

Citations

References

External links

Paluma-class survey motor launches
Survey ships of the Royal Australian Navy
Naval ships of Australia
1990 ships